Abdul Aziz Alpak (born ) is a Turkish male weightlifter, competing in the 105 kg category and representing Turkey at international competitions. He pawqeticipated at the 2000 Summer Olympics in the 105 kg event. He competed at world championships, most recently at the 2001 World Weightlifting Championships.

Major results

References

External links
 

1975 births
Living people
Turkish male weightlifters
Weightlifters at the 2000 Summer Olympics
Olympic weightlifters of Turkey
Place of birth missing (living people)
Mediterranean Games gold medalists for Turkey
Mediterranean Games medalists in weightlifting
Competitors at the 2001 Mediterranean Games
20th-century Turkish people
21st-century Turkish people